Love at First Bite is a 1979 American comedy horror film directed by Stan Dragoti and written by Robert Kaufman, using characters originally created by Bram Stoker. It stars George Hamilton, Susan Saint James, Richard Benjamin, and Arte Johnson. Against a chorus of howling wolves, the first line of the film is: “Children of the Night, shut up!” When the Communist regime ejects the Count from his ancestral home, he and Renfield go in search of the current  incarnation of Dracula's true love, a fashion model living in New York City. Comedy ensues when the incurably romantic Count finds it difficult to adjust to life in the Big Apple in the late 1970s, but true love triumphs in the end. The original music score was composed by Charles Bernstein. The film's tagline is: "Your favorite pain in the neck is about to bite your funny bone!"  An earlier version of the script by director Richard Rush was titled Dracula Sucks Again.

Plot
The infamous vampire Count Dracula is expelled from his castle by the Communist government of Romania, which plans to convert it into a training facility for gymnasts (including Nadia Comăneci). The world-weary Count travels to New York City with his bug-eating manservant, Renfield, and establishes himself in a hotel ... only after an airport transport mix-up accidentally sends his coffin to be the centerpiece at a funeral in a black church in Harlem. While Dracula learns that late 1970s America contains such wonders as blood banks, sex clubs, and discotheques, the Count also proceeds to suffer the general ego-crushing that comes from life in the Big Apple, after he romantically pursues flaky fashion model Cindy Sondheim. He has admired her from afar, believing her to be the current reincarnation of his true love Mina Harker.

Dracula is ineptly pursued in turn by Cindy Sondheim's psychiatrist and quasi-boyfriend Jeffrey Rosenberg. Jeffrey is the grandson of Dracula's old nemesis Fritz  van Helsing, who changed his name to Rosenberg "for professional reasons". Rosenberg's numerous methods to combat Dracula (mirrors, garlic, a Star of David, which he uses instead of a cross, and hypnosis) are easily averted by the Count. Rosenberg also tries burning Dracula's coffin with the vampire still inside, but he is arrested by hotel security. Subsequently he tries to shoot Dracula with three silver bullets, but the Count remains unscathed, patiently explaining that this works only on werewolves. Rosenberg's increasingly erratic actions eventually cause him to be locked away as a lunatic. As mysterious cases of blood-bank robberies and vampiric attacks begin to spread, NYPD Lieutenant Ferguson starts to believe the psychiatrist's claims and gets Rosenberg released.

As a major blackout hits the city, Dracula flees with Cindy via taxi cab back to the airport, pursued by Rosenberg and Ferguson. His coffin is accidentally sent to Jamaica instead of London and the couple miss their flight. On the runway, Cindy finally agrees to become Dracula's vampire bride. Rosenberg attempts to stake Dracula, but as he moves in for the kill, they fly away. A check falls from the sky, by which Cindy pays off her (enormous) psychiatry bill owed to Rosenberg. He remarks, "She has become a responsible person ... or whatever". Rosenberg keeps Dracula's cape (the only thing his stake struck) which Ferguson borrows, hoping, since the cape makes the wearer, it will help him be stylish on his wedding anniversary. Dracula and Cindy, now transformed into bats, fly toward Jamaica. Dracula warns Cindy that they can only live by night. “That's all right with me,” she replies, “…I could never really get my (act) together before 7 anyway.”

Cast

 George Hamilton as Count Vladimir Dracula
 Susan Saint James as Cindy Sondheim
 Richard Benjamin as Dr. Jeffrey Rosenberg/Van Helsing
 Dick Shawn as Lieutenant Ferguson NYPD
 Arte Johnson as Renfield
 Ronnie Schell as Guy in Elevator
 Isabel Sanford as Judge R. Thomas
 Sherman Hemsley as Reverend Mike
 Barry Gordon as Flashlight Vendor
 Bob Basso as T.V. Repairman
 Bryan O'Byrne as Priest
 Ralph Manza as Limo Driver
 Michael Pataki as Mobster
 Susan Tolsky as Model Agent

Production
The inspiration for the film came about when George Hamilton met Harold Sonny Van Arnem and together they met with screenwriter Robert Kaufman and agreed to produce the film with poolside impressions of Bela Lugosi, and thoughts turned to what would happen if Dracula lived in modern New York City. Sonny Van Arnem contracted directly with Kaufman to write a script based on the combined thoughts from George, Bob, and Sonny.
Van arnem paid Robert Kaufman $25,000 to write the script.
The initial script was titled "Dracula Sucks Again" and was owned exclusively by Van Arnem until it was sold to Mel Simon who agreed to finance the film production and later acquired by Melvin Simon, a shopping-mall entrepreneur with an interest in films. Director Stan Dragoti became attached to the project through Peter Sellers, an acquaintance of Kaufman.

Release
The film opened in Detroit in conjunction with the Detroit Express Pro Soccer opening season in March 1979 at the Silverdome in Pontiac Michigan The film then opened in 88 theaters in Chicago, Philadelphia and San Francisco on April 6, 1979. It expanded the following weekend into another 134 theaters in nine cities, including New York and Boston.

Home media
The film was first released on VHS in 1983 from Orion Home Video, again on VHS June 16, 1993 from Warner Home Video, and finally on DVD, July 12, 2005, from MGM. On the later VHS and DVD releases, the song played during the disco scene, "I Love the Nightlife" by Alicia Bridges, was removed and replaced with a different song. Shout! Factory released the film in February 2015 on Blu-ray Disc (with the original disco song by Bridges intact) as a double feature with Once Bitten (1985), the audio enhanced to 5.1 surround sound on both features.

Reception
The film was a financial success, grossing $2,136,923 in its first 10 days. It went on to gross $44 million against a $3 million budget and ranking at number 13 on a list of the top grossing films of 1979. It was AIP's highest-grossing film until the release of The Amityville Horror later in the year. It was one of the highest-grossing independent films for many years. Critical reviews at the time were mixed, however. Love at First Bite has a 70% "Fresh" rating at the film review aggregator website Rotten Tomatoes, based on 23 reviews with the site's consensus reading: "Love At First Bite could use some more warm-blooded barbs to liven up its undead comedy, but George Hamilton's campy charisma gives the prince of darkness some welcome pizazz".

Janet Maslin of The New York Times described Love as "[a] coarse, delightful little movie with a bang-up cast and no pretensions at all," while Dave Kehr lamented the film's "hodgepodge of flat one-liners and graceless slapstick." Variety noted a "tendency to lurch from joke to joke" and observed that the story may be "silly," but Hamilton "makes it work. In the first place, he's funny just to watch." Gene Siskel of the Chicago Tribune gave the film zero stars out of four, writing that Hamilton "has no idea how to play comedy" and gave "a smug performance in a film full of tired jokes and some of the most cruel racial stereotyping you'll ever see." Charles Champlin of the Los Angeles Times wrote, "It is not quite the coupling of the decade, and Ms. St. James, although sympathetic, looks occasionally distracted, as if she were expecting a phone call at any minute. But Hamilton, baying 'Children of de night, shawt opp' at the baying wolves outside, has all the energy the movie needs. His characterization, grandly sweeping, sincere, preposterous but solemn, is just right." Gary Arnold of The Washington Post suggested that the film "was evidently contrived by funnymen who started to run short of gags right after thinking up the title," also observing that Susan Saint James "doesn't even seem to be trying" and that "Hamilton does an acceptable vocal impression of Bela Lugosi, but the act may have been more amusing when he was just doing it for friends." Tom Milne of The Monthly Film Bulletin compared the film to the work of Mel Brooks and opined that it had "fewer belly-laughs than Young Frankenstein" but was "more consistent in its humour, partly because it pays more attention to character ... but chiefly because it adheres to its aim of producing 'a comedic Dracula, rather than a comical one.'"

Accolades

Sequel
Hamilton purchased the film's copyright from Melvin Simon Productions and has been very eager to make a sequel. In 2009, he stated:

It's terrific. It's all about old world school of Dracula in the Bela Lugosi 1940s up against the Twilight felons with humor, It's hard to do but it's great fun. I think 'Twilight' is a wonderful series of books. It's so important for these young girls with hormonal changes and this love that's worth giving your life for. But now I have to find a way to bring my 'Love At First Bite' character into that kind of story and make it funny and not be at all like 'Twilight' and I think I found a way to do that.

He later elaborated about the plot:

His [my character's] son is a sort of perennial student in California and he doesn't want to acknowledge his father, Dracula, at all and he's getting married into a family of televangelists. {Laughs} He met this girl that he's in love with who's a zoologist in a cave somewhere; he was a bat in this cave in South America.  So now, Dracula's forced himself to come to Hollywood for this big wedding and bring all of his relatives who are pretty ridiculous people.  There's a wonderful scene at the bachelor party in a strip club, it's great stuff.

To date, a sequel has not gone into production.

See also
 Vampire film

References

External links

 
 
 
 
 New York Times listing

1979 films
1970s comedy horror films
1979 romantic comedy films
American comedy horror films
American International Pictures films
American parody films
American romantic comedy films
American vampire films
Dracula films
Films directed by Stan Dragoti
Films scored by Charles Bernstein
Films set in New York City
Films shot in New York City
Parodies of horror
Vampire comedy films
1970s English-language films
1970s American films